The Omaha Mavericks women's basketball team, also called the Nebraska–Omaha Mavericks, represents the University of Nebraska Omaha in Omaha, Nebraska, United States. The Mavericks compete in The Summit League and play in the new on-campus Baxter Arena, built prior to the 2015–16 season. The Mavericks are now eligible for the NCAA tournament, NIT, or The Summit League Tournament, having completed the school's four-year transition from Division II to Division I, which began in the 2011–12 season.

Postseason

NCAA Division II
The Mavericks made three appearances in the NCAA Division II women's basketball tournament. They had a combined record of 0–3.

AIAW College Division/Division II
The Mavericks made one appearance in the AIAW National Division II basketball tournament, with a combined record of 0–1.

Notes

References

External links
 

 
Basketball teams established in 1970